Qaitea is an area that gathers Lebanese villages in Akkar District in Akkar Governorate.

Villages

 Aayoun El Ghizlane
 Ain El Zehab
 Bebnine
 Beit Ayoub
 Beit El Haouch
 Beit Younes
 Berkail
 Borj El Aarab
 Bqerzla
 Bzal
 Chane
 Deir Dalloum
 Denbo
 Fneidik
 Habchit
 Houaich
 Hrar
 Jdaidet El Qaitea
 Karkaf
 Kherbet El Jord
 Mahmra
 Majdala
 Mar Touma
 Mbarkiyeh
 Mish Mish
 Ouadi Ej Jamous
 Qabeit
 Qardaf
 Qloud El Baqieh
 Sayssouq
 Sfinet El Qayteaa
 Wadi Jamous
 Zouq El Hassineh
 Zouq El Hbalsa
 Zouq Haddara

References

Akkar divisions